The Legislature X of Italy was the 10th legislature of the Italian Republic, and lasted from 2 July 1987 until 22 April 1992. Its composition was the one resulting from the general election of 14 and 15 June 1987. The election was called by President Cossiga on 28 April 1987, when he dissolved the Houses of Parliament.

History

Following the general election, Christian democrat Giovanni Goria, a protégé of DC party leader Ciriaco De Mita, became Prime Minister at the head of a renewed Pentapartito coalition. At that time Goria was the youngest Prime Minister of Italy since the birth of the republic. Despite the initial credit towards Goria's reformist agenda, he was soon forced to resign in April 1988 after the Parliament refused to pass the government budget. Subsequently, De Mita himself was appointed Prime Minister: his short time in office just witnessed the passage of a law in May 1988 that introduced a new benefit for salaried workers called "benefit for the family nucleus", with the amount varying depending on the number of family members and the family income of the previous year.

However, in Spring 1989 the so-called "pact of the camper" stipulated between the socialist leader Bettino Craxi and the Christian democratic leaders Arnaldo Forlani and Giulio Andreotti – secretly shared in a parking out of Ex Ansaldo factory in Milan, where the Congress of the Italian Socialist Party were taking place – provided a new path that would have started with the fall of the De Mita's government and the formation of a cabinet with a social democrat-led transition, culminating in another Craxi's government, while Andreotti or Forlani would have been elected President of Italy in the 1992 presidential election. As agreed, shortly after De Mita's government fell and on 22 July 1989 Andreotti was sworn in for the third time as Prime Minister. His government was characterized by a turbulent course: Andreotti decided to stay at the head of government, despite the abandonment of many social democratic ministers, after the approval of the norm on TV spots (favorable to private TV channels of Silvio Berlusconi).

In 1990 Andreotti revealed the existence of the Operation Gladio; Gladio was the codename for a clandestine North Atlantic Treaty Organization (NATO) "stay-behind" operation in Italy during the Cold War. Its purpose was to prepare for, and implement, armed resistance in the event of a Warsaw Pact invasion and conquest. Although Gladio specifically refers to the Italian branch of the NATO stay-behind organizations, "Operation Gladio" is used as an informal name for all of them.

During his premiership Andreotti clashed many times with President of the Republic Francesco Cossiga.

Government

Composition

Chamber of Deputies
 President: Nilde Iotti (PCI), elected on 2 July 1987
 Vice Presidents: Aldo Aniasi (PSI), Alfredo Biondi (PLI), Vito Lattanzio (DC, until 12 May 1988), Gerardo Bianco (DC, until 27 July 1990), Michele Zolla (DC, from 12 May 1988), Adolfo Sarti (DC, from 18 October 1990)

Senate
 President: Giovanni Spadolini (PRI), elected on 2 July 1987
 Vice Presidents: Luciano Lama (PDS), Paolo Emilio Taviani (DC), Giorgio De Giuseppe (DC), Gino Scevarolli (PSI)

Senators for Life

References

Legislatures of Italy
1987 establishments in Italy
1992 disestablishments in Italy